The 1961 SCCA National Sports Car Championship season was the eleventh season of the Sports Car Club of America's National Sports Car Championship. It began February 5, 1961, and ended September 23, 1961, after thirteen races.

Classes
The class structure was changed to allow certain cars to be moved out of their displacement class, based on past performance.  The nominal class structure was as follows:

Schedule

 Feature race

Season results
Feature race overall winners in bold.

 C and D Modified were classified together at Marlboro; the combined class was won by Fred Gamble's DM Maserati Tipo 61.  The highest-finishing CM car was Bud Faust's Ferrari-Chevrolet in 2nd.
 F Modified were classified with E Modified at Marlboro.
 F Modified were classified with E Modified at VIR.
 I Modified were classified with H Modified at Cumberland.
 C Modified were classified with B Modified at the Road America June Sprints.
 E Modified were classified with D Modified at Lime Rock Park.
 A 'Guest' class also ran at Meadowdale, and was won by Augie Pabst in a Ferrari 625 TR.
 E and F Modified were classified together at Bridgehampton (August); the combined class was won by Bob Bucher's FM Porsche.  The highest-finishing EM car was Henry Schwartz's Porsche in 3rd.
 C and D Modified were classified together at Thompson; the combined class was won by George Constantine's DM Ferrari.

Champions

References

External links
World Sports Racing Prototypes: SCCA 1960
Racing Sports Cars: SCCA archive
Etceterini: 1961 program covers

SCCA National Sports Car Championship
Scca National Sports Car Championship
 
1961 in American motorsport